The 2011 Canberra Raiders season was the 30th in the club's history. Coached by David Furner and captained by Alan Tongue, they competed in the NRL's 2011 Telstra Premiership, finishing the regular season 15th (out of 16) so failing to make the play-offs.

Season summary
Following on from an encouraging 2010 season where the Raiders made it to the second week of the finals for the first time in 7 years, the Raiders will be looking to seriously challenge for the title in 2011. The club has managed to keep the bulk of its exciting young roster together, whilst adding experienced campaigners Brett White and former Dally M medalist Matt Orford to the team. Young speedster Blake Ferguson has also been recruited by the Raiders from the Cronulla Sharks for the 2011 season.

The Raiders have performed well below expectations since their convincing Round 1 victory against the Cronulla Sharks.  New recruit Blake Ferguson has been a shining light, having scored a team high 10 tries so far this season for the Canberra Raiders, including a hat-trick against the Wests Tigers in Round 3. Matt Orford is yet to make a considerable impact for the Green Machine in 2011.

The Raiders equalled their longest ever losing streak of 8 matches between Round 2 and Round 9, and only managed to avoid breaking their longest ever losing streak with a shock win against the Melbourne Storm in Round 10.  Melbourne were at odds of $1.14 to win the game before going on to lose 20–12.  Canberra holds on to slim hopes of making the finals at the end of the 2011 season.  Based on previous seasons, Raiders would be expected to need to win at least 7 of their remaining 9 matches to make the Top 8.

Results

Telstra Premiership

Squad

Preseason transfers

IN

 Blake Ferguson (from Cronulla Sharks)
 Matt Orford (from Bradford Bulls)
 Brett White (from Melbourne Storm

OUT

 Justin Carney (to Sydney Roosters)
 Marc Herbert (to Bradford Bulls)
 Brett Kelly (to Avignion)
 Adam Mogg (Retirement)
 Joel Monaghan (to Warrington Wolves)
 Scott Logan (Retirement)
 Troy Thompson (to Melbourne Storm)

Player statistics

Ladders

References

External links

Canberra Raiders seasons
Canberra Raiders season